Ceracanthia soraella is a species of snout moth. It was described by Druce in 1899, and is known from Mexico, Costa Rica, Guatemala, Panama, Belize, French Guiana, Ecuador, and Brazil.

References

Moths described in 1899
Phycitinae